is a series of fantasy novels written by Noriko Ogiwara. Six volumes have been released. The first volume was published by Kadokawa Shoten in 2008, while the last was published in 2012. The manga adaptation, illustrated by Ranmaru Kotone and published by Kadokawa Shoten, was serialized between 2012 and 2014. A 12-episode anime television series adaptation by P.A. Works aired between April and June 2013. The full anime series became available for streaming on Netflix (US) on August 1, 2015.

Plot
The story revolves around Izumiko Suzuhara, a 15-year-old girl who was raised at Tamakura Shrine, which is a part of the Kumano Shrines World Heritage Site. She has the ability to destroy any electrical device that she touches. Despite being shy, she wants to try living in the city. Her guardian Yukimasa Sagara recommends that she enroll at Hōjō High School in Tokyo accompanied by his son, Miyuki Sagara. Miyuki has trained to become a yamabushi from a young age. While in Tokyo on a middle school field trip, an entity named "Himegami" appears. Izumiko learns that she is a yorishiro (or, more properly, a yorimashi, as she is a possessed person, not object), a vessel for a Shinto spirit known as a kami. She also learns that Miyuki is tasked with protecting her.

Characters

Main characters

Izumiko is described by Miyuki as a dull-looking girl with twin braids. Before beginning her first year of high school in Tokyo she wore red-rimmed glasses that were given to her by her mother. At the beginning of the series she is very timid and shy, and doesn't like to share her desires or opinions with others. However, as the series progresses she begins to change and becomes more confident. One trait that shocks most people that meet her is that she has lived a few years of her life without using electronics, because they used to break whenever she tried to. It is revealed in episode 2 that Izumiko is destined to serve as the vessel for a powerful ancient goddess  and will most likely be her final vessel. Later in the season, it is revealed that her mother gave her the glasses to block her vision, because she "sees too much". Without them she can identify spirit agents, ghosts, and gods; though they appear to her as frightening creatures covered in a black aura.

Miyuki is the son of Yukimasa and also a monk in training. When he is first introduced he is very cruel to Izumiko and said that he couldn't believe a goddess was in such a dull girl like her. However, after seeing her powers and learning more about her he began to soften up towards her. Even after Yukimasa gave him the chance to go back home he decided to stay with Izumiko and protect her. After moving to Tokyo together, Izumiko and Miyuki grow closer; but Miyuki doesn't believe he can truly protect Izumiko. He believes he is weak and can't even take care of himself. Miyuki has a very strained relationship with his father, whom he hates. At first when Miyuki refuses to serve Izumiko, Yukimasa took him into the woods it is implied that he beat him into submission. Yukimasa often calls Miyuki unworthy of serving Izumiko and belittles him every chance he gets. As the series progresses he begins to fall in love with Izumiko.

Triplets older sister of Manatsu and Masumi. In the third episode she is introduced as Izumiko's cheerful and kind roommate. However, in episode four it is revealed that she is a monk and is currently involved in a secret school-wide rivalry between herself and Takayanagi. Although she seems kind, she at times can be just as calculating as Takayanagi. After witnessing Izumiko's ability to identify Takayanagi's spirit agents, she realizes that Izumiko and Miyuki might be more powerful than she thought. She decides to try and recruit Izumiko, and attacks Miyuki to reveal his true strength.

Triplets younger brother of Mayura. One of Manatsu's defining characteristics is his intense love of horses. Especially his first horse, Tabi. He is usually very cheerful and kind, but when it comes to his family he can be very determined and fiercely protective just like Masumi.

Triplets younger brother of Mayura. He died of a heart defect while taking an afternoon nap when he was six. Masumi is very protective of his siblings and does his best to keep them safe when he can. Mayura and Manatsu are capable of summoning him as a divine spirit and communicate with him often. In his fight against Takayanagi it is clear he is very powerful and capable of devouring spirits. He has a very playful personality and sometimes likes to dress in girl's clothing much to chagrin of his identical brother Manatsu. However, when his family is threatened he can become serious and have a much darker personality.

 The father of Miyuki, his sole intention is to protect the goddess. Despite being 33 years of age, he looks quite young and lively. In some scenes in the anime it is shown that he is awfully strict and looks down upon Miyuki. He has a job as a model and is also a trained mountain monk.

Others

Izumiko's mother.

Izumiko's father, who works overseas.

Izumiko's spirit familiar; he gained a physical appearance due to her wish to have friends. He can control other students and tries to use them to get rid of Miyuki for the purpose of keeping Izumiko from Tokyo.

 Student council president candidate and top student. He badly desired to become the student council president, and acquired assistance from Spirit agents. However, he bore a grudge against Mayura for competing against him. In the end he lost the battle but intended to ruin the Sengoku festival organized by the student council. When Izumiko found out his plans, she went into a rage and transformed him into a white dog. In the end, however, he was converted back.

Student council president and associate of Murakami Hodaka.

Former student council president of Hōjō Academy. He also identifies himself as an oracle and a judge in the battle to become a World Heritage Candidate. The goddess within Izumiko also called him the male god of art and said that she knew him from hundreds of years ago.

He's Izumiko's Driver.

He's Izumiko's grandfather.

She was one of Izumiko's friends from her previous school.

Another one of Izumiko's friends from her previous school.

Media

Novel series
The novel series is written by Noriko Ogiwara and published by Kadokawa Shoten. The first volume was published under the Kadokawa Gin no Saji Series imprint on July 4, 2008, and the last, the sixth, on November 29, 2012. The series is illustrated by Komako Sakai in the original novel version (cover only), and Mel Kishida in the Sneaker Bunko light novel re-edition.

Manga
A manga series adaptation, illustrated by Ranmaru Kotone and published by Kadokawa Shoten in Monthly Shonen Ace magazine began serialization in December 2012 issue released on October 26, 2012. It ended its run in the September issue on July 26, 2014. The series was compiled into five tankōbon volumes between February 21, 2013, and September 26, 2014.

Anime
It was adapted into an anime television series by P.A. Works, with original character designs by Mel Kishida, directed by Toshiya Shinohara. The first episode was streamed on Niconico on March 16, 2013 and aired on television on April 4, 2013. Funimation later added the English dub version in June 2014, alongside Date A Live, Karneval and Code:Breaker.

References

External links

 

Book series introduced in 2008
2008 Japanese novels
2013 anime television series debuts
Fantasy anime and manga
Fantasy novel series
Funimation
Japanese fantasy novels
Japanese children's novels
Kadokawa Shoten manga
Kadokawa Dwango franchises
P.A.Works
Shinto kami in anime and manga
Television shows based on Japanese novels
Tokyo MX original programming
2008 children's books
Shōnen manga
Shinto in fiction